Taunton Deane was a local government district with borough status in Somerset, England.  Its council was based in Taunton.

The district was formed on 1 April 1974, under the Local Government Act 1972, by a merger of the Municipal Borough of Taunton, Wellington Urban District, Taunton Rural District, and Wellington Rural District.

Taunton Deane was granted borough status in 1975, perpetuating the mayoralty of Taunton.

The district was given the name of an alternative form of the Taunton Deane Hundred.

In September 2016, West Somerset and Taunton Deane councils agreed in principle to merge the districts into one (with one council) subject to consultation. The new district would not be a unitary authority, with Somerset County Council still performing its functions. In March 2018 both councils voted in favour of the merger and it came into effect on 1 April 2019, with the first elections to the new council in May 2019. The new district is known as Somerset West and Taunton.

Governance

The district was governed by Taunton Deane Borough Council, and had periods of both Conservative and Liberal Democrat control, as well as times under no overall control. At the final election in 2015, the Conservatives gained an increased majority on the council.

Settlements

Settlements in bold have a town charter or a population over 2,500.

 Ash Priors - Ashbrittle
 Bathealton - Bickenhall - Bishop's Hull - Bishops Lydeard - Bradford-on-Tone - Burrowbridge
 Cheddon Fitzpaine - Chipstable - Churchstanton - Combe Florey - Comeytrowe - Corfe - Cotford St Luke - Cothelstone - Creech St Michael - Curland
 Durston
 Fitzhead
 Halse - Hatch Beauchamp
 Kingston St Mary
 Langford Budville - Lydeard St Lawrence
 Milverton
 North Curry - Norton Fitzwarren - Nynehead
 Oake - Orchard Portman - Otterford
 Pitminster
 Ruishton
 Sampford Arundel - Staple Fitzpaine - Staplegrove - Stawley - Stoke St Gregory - Stoke St Mary
 Taunton - Thornfalcon - Tolland - Trull
 Wellington - West Bagborough - West Buckland - West Monkton - Wiveliscombe

Parishes
Part of the former Taunton Municipal Borough is unparished.

Demography

The town of Taunton (which for population estimates includes the unparished area - or former municipal borough - plus the neighbouring parishes of Bishop's Hull, Comeytrowe, Norton Fitzwarren, Staplegrove, Trull and West Monkton) had an estimated population of 61,400 in 2001.

Taunton forms part of the larger borough of Taunton Deane which also includes the town of Wellington and surrounding villages.  Taunton Deane had an estimated population of 102,600 in 2001.

The figures below are for the Taunton Deane area.

Education

County schools (those which are not independent) in the five non-metropolitan districts of the county are operated by Somerset County Council, or are independent of the council and run as academies.

For a full list of schools see: List of schools in Somerset

See also

 List of Grade I listed buildings in Taunton Deane
 List of Scheduled Monuments in Taunton Deane

References

External links
Taunton Deane Borough Council
 Taunton Deane Tourist Information

 
Former non-metropolitan districts of Somerset
Former boroughs in England
Somerset West and Taunton